A T-S diagram may refer to:

 a temperature salinity diagram;
 a temperature-entropy diagram;
 a Tanabe–Sugano diagram.